The 1888 United States presidential election in Arkansas took place on November 6, 1888, as part of the 1888 United States presidential election. Voters chose seven representatives, or electors to the Electoral College, who voted for president and vice president.

Arkansas voted for the Democratic nominee, incumbent President Grover Cleveland, over the Republican nominee, Benjamin Harrison. Cleveland won the state by a margin of 16.76%.

Results

See also
 United States presidential elections in Arkansas

Notes

References

 

Arkansas
1888
1888 Arkansas elections